Kalkandere is a town in Rize Province in the Black Sea region of Turkey, west of the city of Rize. It is the seat of Kalkandere District. Its population is 6,871 (2021).

Kalkandere is a small town providing public services to the surrounding area. There are primary schools in the villages but children must come into town for high school. There are tea processing plants in the town.

History
See Rize Province for the history of this area.

Places of interest
There is a picnic area on the road between Kalkandere and İkizdere.

References

Populated places in Rize Province
Kalkandere District
Towns in Turkey